Roy Orbison's Greatest Hits is a  Roy Orbison record album from Monument Records recorded at the RCA Studio B in Nashville and released in 1962. Between the hit songs were also "Love Star" and "Evergreen" which were released here for the first time. "Dream Baby" had recently been a No. 4 hit in the United States and No. 2 in England.

According to the authorised Roy Orbison biography, this was Orbison's third album on the Monument label, and his first greatest hits compilation. It was a success remaining in the charts for 140 weeks. It was re-released in 1967 after his departure from Monument Records.

Track listing

References

 

Albums produced by Fred Foster
Roy Orbison compilation albums
1962 greatest hits albums
Monument Records compilation albums